is a manga series written and illustrated by Momoko Sakura. The series depicts the simple, everyday life of Momoko Sakura, a young girl everyone calls Maruko, and her family in suburban Japan in the year 1974. Maruko is a troublemaker, and every episode recounts Maruko's trouble and how she and her friends succeed in solving the situation.
The series is set in the former of Irie District (入江町), Shimizu, now part of Shizuoka City, birthplace of its author.

The first story under the title "Chibi Maruko-chan" was published in the August 1986 edition of the manga magazine Ribon. Other semi-autobiographical stories by the author had appeared in Ribon and Ribon Original in 1984 and 1985, and were included in the first "Chibi Maruko-chan" tankōbon in 1987. The author first began writing and submitting strips in her final year of senior high school, although Shueisha (the publisher of Ribon and Ribon Original) did not decide to run them until over a year later. The author's intent was to write "essays in manga form"; many stories are inspired by incidents from her own life, and some characters are based on her family and friends. The nostalgic, honest and thoughtful tone of the strip led to its becoming popular among a wider audience.

Chibi Maruko-chan was adapted into an anime television series by Nippon Animation, which originally aired on Fuji Television and affiliated TV stations from January 7, 1990 to September 27, 1992. It has also spawned numerous games, animated films and merchandising, as well as a second TV series running from 1995 to the present. Maruko's style and themes are sometimes compared to the classic comic Sazae-san. In 1989, the manga tied to receive the Kodansha Manga Award for the shōjo category. As of 2006, the collected volumes of the manga had sold more than 31 million copies in Japan, making it one of the best-selling manga series.

On April 25, 2020, it was announced that the second series would be suspended due to the COVID-19 pandemic. On June 14, 2020, it was announced that it would resume on June 21, 2020.

Themes

Characters
The series has a large number and variety of secondary and recurring characters, some inspired by people who Sakura met. Some of them debuted in the anime and others derive from the original manga. Following are descriptions of the main characters and family members that appear frequently in all chapters and episodes.

Sakura family

, Live-Action: Ei Morisako (2006 special), Ayaka Ito (2007 show)
The title character, Maruko (born May 8, 1965), is a nine-year-old third-grade student raised in a modest family of six. It is implied that the show is drawn by Maruko herself.

 (1990-2016), Machiko Toyoshima (2016-), Live-Action: Mayuko Fukuda (2006 special), Maaya Murasaki (2007 show)
Maruko's older sister. Her birthday is March 21, 1963, making her 11 in the series.

, Live-Action: Katsumi Takahashi (2006 special), Masakazu Mimura (2007 show)
Maruko's father. He was introduced to Maruko's mother by her friend. His birthday is June 20, 1934, making him 40 years old during the series.

, Live-Action: Michiko Shimizu (2006 special), Noriko Sakai (2007 show)
Maruko's mother. Her birthdate is May 25, 1934. It is revealed in one episode that her maiden name is Kobayashi.

Voiced by: Kei Tomiyama (1990-1995), Takeshi Aono (1995-2010), Bin Shimada (2010-), Live-Action: Fuyuki Moto
Maruko's kind but absent-minded paternal grandfather, Hiroshi's father, and Sumire's father-in-law. His birthday is October 3, 1898, making him 76 in the series. The author has said that she used her own grandfather as the model for Tomozou, but that his personality is the opposite of Tomozou's.

, Live-Action: Yoshie Ichige (2006 special), Yoshiko Miyazaki (2007 show)
Maruko's paternal grandmother, Hiroshi's mother, and Sumire's mother-in-law. She's wise and knows what's good for the human body and wears a traditional Kimono. She was born on April 4, 1902. Her name of Kotake was never known in the series until it appeared in a 4-panel manga (Yonkoma) on July 1, 2007.

Media

Manga
The original Chibi Maruko-chan manga was serialized in the shōjo-oriented Ribon Magazine. 14 volumes were published from July 1987 to December 1996, with a 15th volume published in February 2003. In July 2007, a 4-frame version of Chibi Maruko-chan was published in every morning edition of several Japanese newspapers such as the Tokyo Shimbun and the Chunichi Shimbun.

The 16th volume of the manga was published on April 15, 2009 and 17th volume was issued on Dec 25, 2018.

The 18th volume was issued on Oct 25, 2022. The new manga was produced by Sakura's long-time assistant Botan Kohagi and other assistants at Sakura Production. The volume contains seven new chapters, and are based on stories that Sakura originally created for the Chibi Maruko-chan television anime.

Spin-offs
A spin-off manga by Momoko Sakura titled  focuses on the character Kimio Nagasawa on High School, was published on the magazine Shogakkan's Big Comic Spirits from January 1993 and May 1995. It was made into an live-action drama, premiering on Tokyo Broadcasting System Television on April 1, 2013.

A square-headed parody version of manga Chibi Maruko-chan titled  was published on Shueisha's Grand Jump magazine from October 19, 2016.

Anime

First series
Chibi Maruko-chan originally aired on Fuji Television and affiliated TV stations. 142 episodes were broadcast, from January 1990 to September 1992. Maruko was voiced by Tarako; other voice actors included Kappei Yamaguchi and Hideki Saijo. Original manga author Momoko Sakura wrote the teleplay for most episodes. The first series was directed by Yumiko Suda, animated by Masaaki Yuasa (who later directed Mind Game in 2004), while the music was composed by Nobuyuki Nakamura. The series attained a TV viewer rating of 39.9% on October 28, 1990, the highest rating ever attained by an animated TV series in Japan. The outro song Odoru Ponpokorin became a hit and was interpreted by several artists including the KinKi Kids and Captain Jack. The series was exported throughout Asia and was especially popular in Taiwan. In addition, 65 episodes were dubbed into Arabic (called Maruko Assagheera, which means Little Maruko), where it garnered attention from people of all ages. It also aired in Germany with the same title as the original and was broadcast by RTL II, Super RTL and Jetix. It aired weekdays on Nick India in India.

Opening theme: 
Yume Ippai (ゆめいっぱい "Full of Dreams") by Yumiko Seki (eps. 1–142)

Ending themes: 
Odoru Pompokolin (おどるポンポコリン) by B.B.Queens (eps. 1-66)
Hashire Shoujiki-mono (走れ正直者 "Run, Honest Person") by Hideki Saijo (eps. 67-142)

Second series
A second series debuted on Fuji Television and affiliated TV stations in January 1995, airing on Sundays in the 6:00 pm time slot, before Sazae-san at 6:30 pm. The series is directed by Jun Takagi and Nobuyuki Nakamura, like the first series, composes the music. The majority of the voice actors from the first series reprised their roles. The first 219 episodes were written by Momoko Sakura, however, she had supervised the episode screenplays from episode 220 up until her death in 2018. In Spain, the show is available via VOD on the website of Neox's children's block, Neox Kidz. On TV Japan, which is available in the United States and Canada, the second series (starting with the episodes broadcast in 2009) now broadcasts weekly in Japanese. In Latin America, is distributed by The Japan Foundation, the dub was produced in Mexico and broadcast on several local, public and other private television networks.

Opening themes:
Ureshii Yokan (うれしい予感 "Feeling Happy") by Marina Watanabe (eps. 1-73), Chibi Maruko-chan (Tarako) (ep. 28)
Humming ga Kikoeru (ハミングがきこえる "Hear the Humming") by Kahimi Karie (eps. 74-179)
Odoru Ponpokorin (おどるポンポコリン) by ManaKana & Shigeru Izumiya (eps. 180–253)
KinKi no Yaruki Man Man Song (KinKiのやる気まんまんソング) by KinKi Kids (eps. 254–294)
Odoru Ponpokorin (おどるポンポコリン) by B.B.Queens (eps. 295–746; 793–807; 888–953)
Odoru Ponpokorin (2010 Version) (おどるポンポコリン（2010年バージョン）) by Kaela Kimura (eps. 747-792)
Odoru Ponpokorin (25th Anniversary Version) (おどるポンポコリン（ちびまる子ちゃん誕生25周年バージョン）) by B.B. Queens (eps. 808–887)
Odoru Ponpokorin (2014 Version) (おどるポンポコリン（2014年バージョン）) by E-Girls (eps. 954–1046)
Odoru Ponpokorin by Sakurako Ohara (Special 19)
Odoru Ponpokorin by Golden Bomber (eps. 1047–1190)
Odoru Ponpokorin by Momoiro Clover Z (eps. 1091-)

Ending themes:
Hari-kiri Jiisan no Rock 'n' Roll (針切じいさんのロケン・ロール) by Hitoshi Ueki (eps. 1-27, 29–73)
Hari-kiri Jiisan no Rock 'n' Roll by Grandfather (Takeshi Aono) and the children (ep. 28)
Akke ni Torareta Toki no Uta (あっけにとられた時のうた) by Tama (eps. 74-130, 132–179)
Yume Ippai Shin Version (ゆめいっぱい（新バージョン） "Full of Dream (New Version)")
Jaga Buttercorn-san (じゃがバタコーンさん) by ManaKana (eps. 180–230)
Chibi Maruko Ondo (ちびまる子音頭) by ManaKana (eps. 231–340)
Kyuujitsu no Uta (Viva La Viva) (休日の歌（Viva La Vida）) by Delighted Mint (eps. 341–416)
Uchū Dai Shuffle (宇宙大シャッフル "Big Shuffle in Outer Space") by Love Jets (eps. 417–481)
Arara no Jumon (アララの呪文) by Chibi Maruko-chan with Bakuchu Mondai (eps. 482–850)
Hyaku-man Nen no Shiawase!! (100万年の幸せ!! "100 Thousand Years of Happiness!!") by Keisuke Kuwata (eps. 851-special 21)
Kimi o Wasurenai yo (キミを忘れないよ "I Won't Forget You") by Sakurako Ohara (special 19)
 by PUFFY (eps. 1119–1216)
 by Kazuyoshi Saito (eps. 1217–)

Live action
A live action series was shown on Fuji Television in 2006. The series was created to commemorate Chibi Maruko-chan'''s 15th anniversary and had 3 episodes, each 2 hours. All costumes and hairstyles are faithful to the original manga. A Taiwanese live-action adaptation was also made begin airing on March 13, 2017.

Both of the second television series and the live action series were broadcast in 1080i HDTV.

Films
"Frame Ritz Cinema is famous In this world" (Festival Frame Ritz Film Layar Lebar)Chibi Maruko-chan (Toho, 1990)Chibi Maruko-chan: My Favorite Song (television film, 1992)Chibi Maruko-chan: A Boy from Italy (2015)Chibi Maruko-chan: The Fantastic Notebook (2022) (Chinese 3DCG film)

Video games
All the Game Boy titles (which consists of minigames) were developed by KID and published by Takara. The other titles were published by different companies like Namco, Konami, Epoch and Banpresto.Chibi Maruko-chan: Uki Uki Shopping (Famicom, 1990)Chibi Maruko-chan: Okozukai Daisakusen (Game Boy, 1990)Chibi Maruko-chan 2: Deluxe Maruko World (Game Boy, 1991)Chibi Maruko-chan: Harikiri 365-Nichi no Maki (Super Famicom, 1991)Chibi Maruko-chan 3: Mezase! Game Taishou no Maki (Game Boy, 1992)Chibi Maruko-chan 4: Korega Nihon Dayo Ouji Sama (Game Boy, 1992)Chibi Maruko-chan: Quiz de Piihyara (PC Engine, 1992)Chibi Maruko-chan: Waku Waku Shopping (Mega Drive, 1992)Chibi Maruko-chan: Maruko Deluxe Quiz (Arcade/Game Boy/Neo-Geo, 1995)Chibi Maruko-chan: Mezase! Minami no Island!! (Super Famicom, 1995)Chibi Maruko-chan no Taisen Puzzle Dama (Sega Saturn, 1995)Chibi Maruko-chan: Maruko Enikki World (PlayStation, 1995)Chibi Maruko-chan: Go Chounai Minna de Game Dayo! (Game Boy Color, 2001)Chibi Maruko-chan DS Maru-chan no Machi (Nintendo DS, 2009)Chibi Maruko-chan (Nintendo 3DS, 2016)
Chibi Maruko-chan: Dream Stage iOS/Android, 2016

Stage 
As part of the project to commemorate the 35th anniversary of the original work, it was announced in October 2021 that the first stage of this work, "Chibi Maruko-chan The Stage", will be produced, scheduled to be performed at the end of 2022. Nelke Planning is in charge of planning and production. In August 2022, it was announced that the title would be "High School Days" and that it would be performed at the Galaxy Theatre from December 15th to December 25th.

Notes
 Kenta Hasegawa (former Japanese international football player). Momoko Sakura, the author of the manga, created a character called Kenta-kun who occasionally makes an appearance. He loves football and is a classmate of Chibi Maruko. This character was created after Hasegawa. Sakura and Hasegawa attended the same primary school during the same period.

References

External links

 
Official International website 

 
1990 anime television series debuts
1992 anime films
1992 Japanese television series endings
1995 anime television series debuts
1996 comics endings
Japanese children's animated comedy television series
Japanese adult animated comedy television series
Fiction set in 1974
Comics set in the 1970s
Animated television series about children
Anime series based on manga
Comedy anime and manga
Fuji TV original programming
Japanese television dramas based on manga
Manga adapted into films
Nippon Animation
Television shows written by Eriko Shinozaki
Shōjo manga
Shueisha franchises
Shueisha manga
Video games based on anime and manga
Winner of Kodansha Manga Award (Shōjo)
Animated children's television sitcoms
Animated adult television sitcoms
Anime postponed due to the COVID-19 pandemic
Anime productions suspended due to the COVID-19 pandemic